Bridges Preparatory School is a public charter school within the South Carolina Public Charter School District, located in Beaufort, South Carolina, United States. The school serves students from most parts of Beaufort County.  It enrolled 700 students in the 2017–18 school year.

Academics
According to data released by the South Carolina Department of Education Bridges Preparatory School showed 56 percent of elementary students achieved standards in English/language arts in 2015–16, seventh among 24 South Carolina Public Charter School District members offering elementary instruction. Math standards were met by 53 percent of students, ranking sixth.
In 2015–16, the average student-teacher ratio in core subjects was 15.90 students for every 1 teacher.

Athletics
Bridges Prep competes at the Class A level in the South Carolina High School League.  The school fields teams for boys in basketball, cross country, and soccer; and for girls in volleyball, basketball, cross country, softball.

Campuses 

Since Bridges Prep opened, they have used several different campuses for different sections of students.

Boundary Street Campus  
The Boundary Street Campus has been the main campus of the school since its beginning in 2013. Located at 1100 Boundary Street in Downtown Beaufort, SC, the building was previously owned by the Boys and Girl's Club of the Lowcountry.

Green Street Campus  
The green Street Campus was the Secondary Campus of the School located at 1001 Hamar Street in Downtown Beaufort SC. The Building is owned by the City of Beaufort and leased to the School until the 2018-19 Fiscal/School Year when the school ceased using the facility. In the 2018-19 School Year, The Campus was reacquired on an emergency temporary basis  due to the fact that severe rain caused the new campus to flood, preventing them from paving

Celadon Campus 
The Celadon Campus is located at the Old Celadon Club on Lady's Island, South Carolina.

Port Royal Campus 

In 2016, Bridges Preparatory School purchased  of land in Beaufort, on which they planned to build a
 school building for its kindergarten through grade 12 students.  In October 2018, students in grades 8 to 11 were moved into "temporary modular classrooms" erected on the new campus property. On January 7, 2020, grades 5th through 8th were moved from the main campus to the new building. The school plans to move all grades by the 2020–2021 school year.

References

Schools in Beaufort County, South Carolina
Charter schools in South Carolina
Educational institutions established in 2013
2013 establishments in South Carolina
Public high schools in South Carolina
Public elementary schools in South Carolina
Public middle schools in South Carolina
Preparatory schools in South Carolina